, also known as , is a Japanese music cable television network operated by , a subsidiary of Sony Music Entertainment Japan, Inc. (SMEJ).

Its motto is We Believe in Music.

History

 July 1, 1998 - SME TV, Inc. launched  (portmanteau of view and music).
 June 1, 2002 - Viewsic was launched on SKY PerfecTV! e2.
 May 1, 2004 - Viewsic was relaunched as Music On! TV.
 October 1, 2009 - Music On! TV was launched in high-definition television.
 March 31, 2012 - Music On! TV, Inc. was merged with sister company Sony Magazines Co., Ltd., becoming M-On Entertainment, Inc. and launched its own website, www.m-on-ent.jp/.

Current Programming

Video Clips
 AniOn! World
 Visualism
 Aa, Itoshi no Kayōkyoku
 K-Pop Hits!
 Saishin Saikyō! Utaeru Hits
 M-On! Hits
 J-Pop Ketteihan! Rekidai Saikyō Million Hits
 Rekidai Karaoke Super Hits
 Anokoro Hits!
 Anokoro Drama Hits!

Music Chart
 J-Pop Saikyō Countdown 20
 J-Pop Saikyō Countdown 50
 M-On! Countdown International
 M-On! Countdown K
 Kan-On! Countdown 10
 M-On! Karaoke Countdown 20
 M-On! Karaoke Countdown 50
 Apple Music Countdown 20
 Line Music Countdown 20
 Tsutaya Rental CD Countdown 20
 Ninki Kashi 20 by UtaMap
 YouTube Japan Music Video Countdown 20

K-pop
 Music Bank
 Show Champion
 SBS Inkigayo

Others
 legato ~Tabisuru Ongaku Studio~

See also
 Sony Music Entertainment Japan
 MTV Japan - rival of M-On!

References

External links
 
 M-On Entertainment, Inc.
 
 

M-On Entertainment
M-On Entertainment
Television stations in Japan
Television channels and stations established in 1998
M-On Entertainment
Music television channels
1998 establishments in Japan
Mass media companies based in Tokyo
Music organizations based in Japan